The Atlanta Express was a soccer club based in Atlanta, Georgia that competed in the SISL.

Following the 1991 outdoor season, the team became the Gwinnett County Steamers.

Year-by-year

E
Defunct soccer clubs in Georgia (U.S. state)
1990 establishments in Georgia (U.S. state)
1992 disestablishments in Georgia (U.S. state)
Association football clubs established in 1990
Association football clubs disestablished in 1992
Defunct indoor soccer clubs in the United States